Egypt competed at the 1992 Summer Olympics in Barcelona, Spain. 75 competitors, 72 men and 3 women, took part in 32 events in 13 sports.

Competitors
The following is the list of number of competitors in the Games.

Boxing

Equestrianism

Fencing

One male fencer represented Egypt in 1992.

Men's foil
 Maged Abdallah

Football

Handball

Men's team competition
Preliminary round (group B)
 Egypt – Romania 21-22
 Egypt – Spain 18-23
 Egypt – Unified Team 18-22
 Egypt – Germany 16-24
 Egypt – France 19-22
Classification Match
 11th/12th place: Egypt – Brazil 27-24 (→ Eleventh place)
Team roster
Hosam Abdallah
Ayman Abdel Hamid Soliman
Mohamed Abdel Mohamed
Ahmed Belal
Ahmed Debes
Ahmed Elattar
Ahmed Elawady
Aser Elkasaby
Khlaed Elkordy
Adel Elsharkawy
Ashraf Mabrouk
Yasser Mahmoud
Gohar Mohamed
Sameh Mohamed
Mohsen Radwan
Amr Serageldin
Mahmoud Soliman
Head coach: Paul Tiedemann

Hockey

Men's team competition
Preliminary round (group A)
 Egypt – Great Britain 0 – 2
 Egypt – Australia 1 – 5
 Egypt – Argentina 0 – 1
 Egypt – Germany 2– 8
 Egypt – India 1 – 2
Classification Matches
 9th-12th place: Egypt – Unified Team 2 – 4
 11th-12th place: Egypt – Argentina 3 – 7 → 12th place
Team roster
 (01.) Mohamed Tantawy (captain and gk)
 (02.) Ibrahim Tawfik
 (03.) Husan Hassan
 (04.) Hisham Korany
 (05.) Gamal Mohamed
 (06.) Abdel Khlik Abou El-Yazi
 (07.) Magdy Ahmed Abdullah
 (08.) Gamal Ahmed Abdulla
 (09.) Ashraf Gindy
 (10.) Gamal Abdelgany
 (11.) Amro Osman
 (12.) Ehab Mansour
 (13.) Mohamed Sayed Abdulla
 (14.) Amro Mohamady
 (15.) Mohamed Mohamed
 (16.) Wael Mostafa (gk)

Judo

Modern pentathlon

Three male pentathletes represented Egypt in 1992.

Individual
 Moustafa Adam
 Mohamed Abdou El-Souad
 Sherif El-Erian

Team
 Moustafa Adam
 Mohamed Abdou El-Souad
 Sherif El-Erian

Shooting

Swimming

Men's 50m Freestyle
 Mohamed Elazoul
 Heat – 23.87 (→ did not advance, 37th place)

Men's 100m Freestyle
 Mohamed Elazoul
 Heat – 53.31 (→ did not advance, 52nd place)

Women's 50m Freestyle
 Rania Elwani
 Heat – 27.20 (→ did not advance, 32nd place)

Women's 100m Freestyle
 Rania Elwani
 Heat – 58.82 (→ did not advance, 30th place)

Women's 200m Freestyle
 Rania Elwani
 Heat – 2:08.93 (→ did not advance, 31st place)

Women's 100m Backstroke
 Rania Elwani
 Heat – 1:10.12 (→ did not advance, 45th place)

Table tennis

Weightlifting

Wrestling

References

Nations at the 1992 Summer Olympics
1992
1992 in Egyptian sport